World Championship Tennis (WCT) was a tour for professional male tennis players established in 1968 (the first players signed a contract at the end of 1967) and lasted until the emergence of the ATP Tour in 1990. A number of tennis tournaments around the world were affiliated with WCT and players were ranked in a special WCT ranking according to their results in those tournaments.

The WCT had an important impact on the commercial development of tennis. It instituted a tie-breaker system and outfitted players with colored clothing, a radical idea at that time. WCT also strongly encouraged the audience to cheer for players, rather than politely applaud, as the more staid tennis audiences had done before. They publicly emphasized their prize money structure and special bonus pool as an incentive to attract top players.

History
World Championship Tennis was founded in September 1967 by New Orleans sports promoter David Dixon, who had earlier witnessed the dreary conditions of the professional circuit before the open era when he visited a poorly promoted match between Rod Laver and Ken Rosewall. In August of that year, he had presented his idea of a pro tennis tour to Lamar Hunt and Al Hill Jr., who agreed to invest. WCT became the major professional tennis tour of players under contract of the early seventies.

After starting with the "Handsome Eight", the original eight players (Dennis Ralston, John Newcombe, Tony Roche, Cliff Drysdale, Earl Buchholz, Niki Pilić, Roger Taylor and Pierre Barthès), the first WCT tournament was held in January 1968 in Sydney, Australia and used the VASSS scoring system.  According to sportswriter Rod Humphries, this first event was a hastily organized tournament held in the parking lot of the Channel 7 television studios in Epping and was won by Tony Roche. The first American WCT tournament was held in February 1968 in Kansas City. In March 1968 Hunt and Hill took over Dixon's 50% stake in WCT and Dixon left the organization. WCT took a loss of $300,000 during its first year of operation. Al Hill, Jr. became president of WCT.

By early 1970, the WCT had signed other players (Marty Riessen, Ray Moore, Tom Okker, Arthur Ashe) and in July it acquired the player contracts of the other major professional organization, the National Tennis League (NTL), which had under contract players from the former professional group of Jack Kramer, namely Rod Laver, Ken Rosewall and Pancho Gonzáles as well as Andrés Gimeno, Roy Emerson, and Fred Stolle.

In 1971, the WCT circuit grew to 21 tournaments around the globe. In July 1971, at its annual meeting, the International Lawn Tennis Federation (ILTF) voted to ban all WCT contract professionals from the ILTF tournaments and facilities from the beginning of 1972 onwards. At the end of the 1971 WCT season, the top eight players from the season were seeded according to their WCT rankings and played a year-end championship tournament in November. This was held about two weeks before the similar championship of the rival Grand Prix circuit, called The Masters. For commercial reasons, from 1972 onward this championship, played on indoor carpet, was usually held in the spring in Dallas, Texas and became known as the WCT Finals. The tournament ran for 19 years and the last championship was held in 1989. The format for this event was adopted by the Association of Tennis Professionals for the year-end Tour Finals.

In April 1972 an agreement was reached between the ILTF and WCT that divided the 1973 tour in a WCT circuit that ran from January through May and a Grand Prix circuit that was scheduled for the rest of the year. Under this agreement WCT players were again allowed to play the Grand Prix tournaments.

The WCT tour was merged into the Grand Prix tennis circuit in 1978. On 30 April 1981 WCT announced its withdrawal from the Grand Prix circuit and the establishment of its own full calendar season for 1982. According to Lamar Hunt the reasons for the withdrawal were the restrictions placed on them by the Men's Professional Council, the administrators of the Grand Prix circuit. In January 1983, WCT sued the Men's International Professional Tennis Council (MIPTC), the Association of Tennis Professionals and the ITF, claiming unfair restriction of trade. In November 1983 a settlement resulted in WCT's reincorporation into the Grand Prix with effect from 1985.

1989 was the last season of WCT. The ATP established its own tennis circuit from 1990. On August 28, 1990, after the Tournament of Champions event at Forest Hills, WCT announced its dissolution.

WCT also built and operated tennis clubs in the United States; WCT Lakeway World of Tennis in Lakeway (metro Austin), Texas and WCT Peachtree World of Tennis in Peachtree Corners (metro Atlanta), Georgia.

WCT by year

WCT 1968

WCT 1969

WCT 1970

WCT 1971

WCT 1972

WCT 1973

WCT 1974

WCT 1975

WCT 1976

WCT 1977

WCT 1982

WCT 1983

WCT 1984

WCT 1985
WCT tournaments returned to the Grand Prix stage after a three-year absence during 1982–84. There were only four events. The titles were split between Ivan Lendl and John McEnroe, winning two each. While McEnroe entered into all four, Lendl played just two and won both. McEnroe grabbed WCT Houston title beating Kevin Curren in the final.

The WCT Finals in Dallas saw the unexpected defeat of McEnroe in the quarter-finals by Joakim Nyström in three straight sets. The title was captured by Lendl, whose success completed a triplicate of titles in three weeks: Fort Myers on hard, Monte Carlo on clay and Dallas on the carpet. Other players have won three, even four, tournaments in successive weeks in the Open Era, but never on different surfaces.

In Atlanta, McEnroe won the final over Paul Annacone, prevailing in three close sets. The WCT Tournament of Champions in Forest Hills ended with much anticipated final between Lendl and McEnroe. Despite winning only two of his last 12 matches over McEnroe in ATP tournaments, Lendl beat McEnroe 6–3 6–3.

WCT 1986
The WCT Atlanta tournament was marked by early exits of both top seeds, Stefan Edberg and Boris Becker, in the first round. Edberg lost to Mikael Pernfors and Becker to eventual runner-up Tim Wilkison. In Dallas, Anders Järryd was the unexpected winner, having replaced the injured Ivan Lendl in the 12-player draw.

WCT 1987

WCT 1988

WCT 1989
1989 was the final year of the WCT tour. Only three events were organized, all of them were incorporated into the Nabisco Grand Prix and gaining ATP ranking points.

The 19th (and last) WCT Finals in Reunion Arena, Dallas saw John McEnroe win his fifth Dallas title. His semifinal with Ivan Lendl produced the best match of the tournament and McEnroe managed to beat Lendl for the first time in a little more than three and a half years. The tournament was negatively impacted by the withdrawals of Boris Becker (who did not appear at all) and Andre Agassi (walking off the court during a second set match with McEnroe). Brad Gilbert entered the event to fill the gap for Becker and surprisingly made it to the final. Later in spring, Lendl captured last two WCT titles in Scottsdale and Forest Hills to close the WCT era.

WCT 1990
There was no WCT tour in 1990, when the ATP established its own circuit named the ATP Tour, however there was one (final) tournament sanctioned by WCT. The Forest Hills WCT at West Side Tennis Club was moved from Har-Tru green clay to hardcourts and run as special non-ATP Tour event. Ivan Lendl stamped his WCT dominance winning the last title.

WCT Year-end Championship Finals

The WCT Finals were usually held in Dallas. The 1971 quarterfinals and semifinals were played in Houston, and the final was played at the Memorial Auditorium in Dallas. The 1972–1979 editions were played at the Moody Coliseum, and the 1980–1989 tournaments at Reunion Arena in Dallas.

The first edition of the WCT Finals in 1971 was played in November, just a few days before The Masters, the equivalent of the WCT Finals for the rival Grand Prix circuit. Because of TV pressure, the second edition was held in May 1972 and most of the following editions were organized in between months of March and May. Nevertheless, in 1972 another edition, less important and with half the prize money, was held in November in Rome. The prize money offered to the winner, Arthur Ashe, was $25,000 compared to the $50,000 won by Ken Rosewall for the main edition in May.

A decade later there were three editions of the WCT Finals; the most important one in Dallas, and the others in autumn in Naples, Italy, and in winter (in January 1983) in Detroit.

WCT final rankings by year

1971 
  R. Laver
  T. Okker
  K. Rosewall
  C. Drysdale
  A. Ashe
  J. Newcombe
  M. Riessen
  B. Lutz
  R. Emerson
  A. Gimeno

1972 
One ranking was issued for the second part of 1971 and first part of 1972, and another for the second part of 1972 final standings. The first eight players in the second ranking played the 1972 autumn-winter WCT Finals held in Rome.

Second part of 1971/first part of 1972
  R. Laver
  K. Rosewall
  T. Okker
  C. Drysdale
  M. Riessen
  A. Ashe
  B. Lutz
  J. Newcombe
 = R. Emerson= C. Pasarell

Second part of 1972

1973
The players were separated into two groups, A & B, with each group playing certain tournaments. The top 4 from each group qualified for the final at the end of the season.

Group A

Group B

1974
The group was divided into three groups, Red, Blue, and Green and the top 8 points winners qualified for the final (marked with*): 2 players by group plus the other two players having most points. Each group played separate tournaments except the Philadelphia tournament at the start of the season.

Red group
  I. Năstase*
  T. Okker*
  T. Gorman
  C. Drysdale
  N. Pilić
  A. Pattison
  J. Alexander
  M. Riessen
  T. Roche
  F. McMillan

Blue group
  J. Newcombe*
  S. Smith*
  A. Metreveli
  D. Stockton
  J. Hřebec
  J. Borowiak
  R. Case
  R. Ramírez
  J. Fillol
  C. Richey

Green group
  A. Ashe*
  R. Laver*
  B. Borg*
  J. Kodeš*
  M. Cox
  R. Tanner
  E. Dibbs
  R. Taylor
  A. Panatta
  O. Parun

1975
The group was divided into three groups again, Red, Blue, and Green and the top 8 points winners qualified for the final (marked with *). Each group played separate tournaments except the Philadelphia tournament at the start of the season.

Red group
  J. Alexander*
  H. Solomon*
  M. Cox*
  S. Smith
  D. Stockton
  B. Lutz
  P. Dent
  C. Drysdale
 = V. Amritraj= M. Riessen

Blue group
  R. Laver*
  R. Tanner*
  R. Ramírez*
  B. Gottfried
  V. Gerulaitis
  J. Fillol
  A. Stone
  A. Pattison
 = J. Borowiak= I. El Shafei

Green group
  A. Ashe*
  B. Borg*
  T. Okker
  B. Mottram
  B. Hewitt
  O. Parun
  K. Warwick
  J. Higueras
  P. Dominguez
  B. Giltinan

1976–1983: All the players were put back together and played the same tournaments.

1976
  A. Ashe
  R. Ramírez
  G. Vilas
  E. Dibbs
  B. Borg
  D. Stockton
  B. Lutz
  H. Solomon
  V. Gerulaitis
  B. Gottfried

1977

1978

1979

1980

1981
  R. Tanner
  J. Connors
  W. Fibak
  Y. Noah
  J. McEnroe
  V. Amritraj
  B. Gottfried
  V. Gerulaitis
  S. Mayer
  G. Mayer

1982
WCT expanded from the previous year and broke away from the Grand Prix for the year. There were three finals, Spring (Dallas) the most important one, Fall (Naples, Italy) and Winter (Detroit) and therefore three different points tables for each season:

Spring
  I. Lendl
  J. L. Clerc
  W. Fibak
  V. Amritraj
  T. Šmíd
  P. McNamara
  J. McEnroe
  V. Gerulaitis
  B. Taróczy
  E. Dibbs

Summer/Fall

Winter

1983 
There were only 9 tournaments and the WCT were back with the Grand Prix circuit.
  I. Lendl
  J. McEnroe
  G. Vilas
  V. Gerulaitis
  J. L. Clerc
  P. McNamee
  T. Šmíd
  W. Fibak
  B. Taróczy
  B. Scanlon

WCT Challenge Cup
Some special events such as the Aetna World Cup (where the Australian pros and the US pros faced in a team event because in 1970, at the start of this event, contract pro players weren't allowed to enter the Davis Cup) or the Challenge Cup (an 8-man tournament) were held by the WCT organization.

List of WCT Challenge Cup winners
1976 – Honolulu – Ilie Năstase defeated Arthur Ashe, 6–3, 1–6, 6–7, 6–3, 6–1
1976/7 – Las Vegas – Ilie Năstase defeated Jimmy Connors, 3–6, 7–6, 6–4, 7–5
1977 – Las Vegas – Jimmy Connors defeated Roscoe Tanner, 6–2, 5–6, 3–6, 6–2, 6–5
1978 – Montego Bay – Ilie Năstase defeated Peter Fleming, 2–6, 5–6, 6–2, 6–4, 6–4
1979 – Montreal – Björn Borg defeated Jimmy Connors, 6–4, 6–2, 2–6, 6–4
1980 – Montreal – John McEnroe defeated Vijay Amritraj, 6–1, 6–2, 6–

See also 
Grand Prix tennis circuit
History of tennis

References

External links
 WorldChampionshipTennis.com: The official website of World Championship Tennis, LLC, owner of the historical archives of World Championship Tennis.
 The $35,000 Racquet Dave Cody, Commonwealth Times 1981-02-17, pages 1,12-13,24, Description of 1981 Richmond WCT.

 
Sports organizations established in 1967
Organizations disestablished in 1990
Defunct tennis tours
Tennis organizations
TVS Television Network
Tennis leagues in the United States